William Francis Hamberger (January 5, 1871 – September 1, 1937) was an American sailor serving in the United States Navy during Boxer Rebellion who received the Medal of Honor for bravery.

Biography
Hamberger was born January 5, 1871, in Newark, New Jersey, and after entering the navy Hamberger was sent as a Chief Carpenter's Mate to China to fight in the Boxer Rebellion.

He died September 1, 1937, and is buried in the Arlington National Cemetery, Arlington, Virginia. His grave can be found in section 6, grave 9164, map grid T 18 When his wife, Elizabeth Martin Hamberger died February 19, 1957, she was buried with him.

Medal of Honor citation
Rank and organization: Chief Carpenter's Mate, U.S. Navy. Born: 5 August 1870, Newark, N.J. Accredited to: New Jersey. G.O. No.: 55, 19 July 1901.

Citation:

Fighting with the relief expedition of the Allied forces on 13, 20, 21 and 22 June 1900, Hamberger distinguished himself by meritorious conduct.

See also

List of Medal of Honor recipients
List of Medal of Honor recipients for the Boxer Rebellion

References
Inline

General

Arlington National Cemetery

1871 births
1937 deaths
United States Navy Medal of Honor recipients
United States Navy officers
Military personnel from Newark, New Jersey
American military personnel of the Boxer Rebellion
Burials at Arlington National Cemetery
Boxer Rebellion recipients of the Medal of Honor